Cladochaeta is a genus of spittlebug flies, insects in the family Drosophilidae. There are at least 120 described species in Cladochaeta.

See also
 List of Cladochaeta species

References

Further reading

External links

 

Drosophilidae genera
Articles created by Qbugbot